Sopranissimo (from Italian Sopra "above" and -issimo "extremely") is any pitch higher than soprano.

One example is the sopranissimo saxophone in B♭. This instrument is pitched an octave above the normal soprano saxophone, and is currently manufactured under the Soprillo brand name. The Sopranissimo saxophone is the smallest instrument of the saxophone family. This includes sopranino, soprano, alto, tenor, baritone, bass, contrabass, and subcontrabass. Only the soprano, alto, tenor, and baritone are commonly used. All saxophones are woodwind instruments.

There are also sopranissimo ukuleles, and sopranissimo recorders.

References

Pitch (music)